Matt Jacobson may refer to:
Matthew C. Jacobson (born 1961), Maine businessman
Matthew Frye Jacobson, Yale professor